Eagle Mountain International Church is an evangelical nondenominational church in Newark, Tarrant County, Texas in the United States. It was founded in 1986 by the evangelist Kenneth Copeland, and the senior pastors are George and Terri Copeland Pearsons, Copeland's son-in-law and daughter.

History 
The church was founded in 1986 by Kenneth Copeland as Eagle Mountain Church. In 1993, the church was renamed to Eagle Mountain International Church and in 1998, following rapid growth, moved to its current location in Fort Worth, Texas, on a 33-acre property that was once the Marine Corps Air Station Eagle Mountain Lake (MCAS Eagle Mountain Lake), a United States Marine Corps air station. The station's airfield is now an airport, run by Kenneth Copeland Ministries as Kenneth Copeland Airport.

The church broadcasts internationally through Kenneth Copeland Ministries and the Victory Channel. Membership averages 1,250 in its weekly services, which are broadcast online and on the Victory Channel. The church also operates a private Bible college called Kenneth Copeland Bible College. The church ministers to the community through its nursing home ministry, hospital ministry, prison ministry, and ministry to military families.

In 2013, at least 20 members of the church were diagnosed with measles after a visitor came to Eagle Mountain from an overseas missions trip and had contracted measles while there. Kenneth Copeland Ministries formerly advocated abstaining from vaccinations and immunizations, for fear they could cause autism. In a September 2013 blog post, George Pearsons wrote: "Our church is not and has never been "anti-vaccination". We do not have an "anti-vaccination" policy. In all our years of pastoring, we have never preached against vaccinations. We have never advised anyone against a vaccination." The church has sponsored several vaccination drives. Terri Pearsons, who had previously expressed concerns about potential links between the measles vaccine and autism, was encouraging parishioners to get vaccinated. However, she said she still had some concerns about vaccines, particularly for young children with a family history of autism, and where several immunizations are given at the same time. Professor William Schaffner, professor at the Vanderbilt University School of Medicine, described the pastor as "misinformed" and said that young children are among the most vulnerable to measles.

Eagle Mountain International Church owns Kenneth Copeland's house. In 2021 the Houston Chronicle reported that the house, valued at $7 million, qualified for tax-free status under a Texas statute that classifies the house as a parsonage.

During the 2022 Russia invasion of Ukraine, Eagle Mountain International Church donated $6.7 million to bring Ukrainian Jewish refugees to Israel by partnering with Keren Hayesod–UIA (United Israel Appeal), and the Jewish Agency for Israel.

References

External links 

 Eagle Mountain International Church
 Kenneth Copeland Bible College

Churches in Tarrant County, Texas
Churches completed in 1986